Kārlis Zariņš may refer to:

Kārlis Zariņš (writer)
Kārlis Reinholds Zariņš